Ceanothus sonomensis, with the common name Sonoma ceanothus, is a rare species of shrub in the family Rhamnaceae. It is endemic to northern California.

Description
The Ceanothus sonomensis shrub is erect in form, approaching a maximum height of one meter. The flat evergreen leaves are oppositely arranged, each oval to rounded in shape with spiny teeth along the edges. They are shiny green on top, paler and fuzzy on the undersides. The inflorescence is a small cluster of blue or lavender flowers, and the fruit is a ridged, horned capsule about half a centimeter long.

Distribution
Ceanothus sonomensis is known only from the Hood Mountain Range. Most of its 10 or so occurrences are located in Sonoma County, and one remains in Napa County. Ceanothus sonomensis is a member of the chaparral plant community in the California montane chaparral and woodlands sub-ecoregion.

References

External links

Jepson Manual Treatment - Ceanothus sonomensis
USDA Plants Profile: Ceanothus sonomensis
Ceanothus sonomensis - Photo gallery

sonomensis
Endemic flora of California
Natural history of the California chaparral and woodlands
Natural history of the California Coast Ranges
Natural history of Sonoma County, California
Plants described in 1939
Taxa named by John Thomas Howell